The 2014–15 Colorado Buffaloes men's basketball team represented the University of Colorado in the 2014–15 NCAA Division I men's basketball season. This was Tad Boyle's fifth year as head coach at Colorado. The Buffaloes played their home games at the Coors Events Center in Boulder, Colorado as members of the Pac-12 Conference. They finished the season 16–18, 7–11 in Pac-12 play to finish in a three-way tie for eighth place. They advanced to the quarterfinals of the Pac-12 tournament where they lost to Oregon. They were invited to the College Basketball Invitational where they defeated Gardner–Webb in the first round before losing in the second round to Seattle.

Previous season
The 2013–14 Colorado Buffaloes finished the season with an overall record of 23–12, and 10–8 in the Pac-12 to finish in a five-way tie for third place. In the 2014 Pac-12 tournament, the team defeated USC in the first round and California in the quarterfinals before losing to Arizona, 43–63 in the semifinals. The Buffaloes received an at-large bid to the 2014 NCAA tournament as an #8 seed in the South Region, where they lost to Pittsburgh, 48–77 in the Round of 64.

Off-season

Departures

2014 recruiting class

Roster

Schedule
 
|-
!colspan=12 style="background:#000000; color:#CEBE70;"| Non-conference regular season

|-
!colspan=12 style="background:#000000;"| Pac-12 regular season

|-
!colspan=12 style="background:#000000;"| Pac-12 tournament

|-
!colspan=12 style="background:#000000;"| College Basketball Invitational

References

Colorado
Colorado Buffaloes men's basketball seasons
Colorado
Colorado Buffaloes men's basketball
Colorado Buffaloes men's basketball